The Potawatomi , also spelled Pottawatomi and Pottawatomie (among many variations), are a Native American people of the Great Plains, upper Mississippi River, and western Great Lakes region. They traditionally speak the Potawatomi language, a member of the Algonquin family. The Potawatomi call themselves Neshnabé, a cognate of the word Anishinaabe. The Potawatomi are part of a long-term alliance, called the Council of Three Fires, with the Ojibway and Odawa (Ottawa). In the Council of Three Fires, the Potawatomi are considered the "youngest brother" and are referred to in this context as Bodéwadmi, a name that means "keepers of the fire" and refers to the council fire of three peoples.

In the 18th century, they were pushed to the west by European/American encroachment and eventually removed from their lands in the Great Lakes region to reservations in Oklahoma. Under Indian Removal, they eventually ceded many of their lands, and most of the Potawatomi relocated to Nebraska, Kansas, and Indian Territory. Some bands survived in the Great Lakes region and today are federally recognized as tribes. In Canada, over 600 First Nation governments or bands are recognized. In the US, 574 tribes or bands are federally recognized.

Name

The English "Potawatomi" is derived from the Ojibwe  (syncoped in the Ottawa as ). Their name means "those who tend the hearth-fire," which refers to the hearth of the Council of Three Fires.

Alternatively, the Potawatomi call themselves , a cognate of Ojibwe , meaning "original people".

Teachings 
The Potawatomi teach their children about the "Seven Grandfather Teachings" of wisdom, respect, love, honesty, humility, bravery, and truth toward each other and all creation, each one of which teaches them the equality and importance of their fellow tribesmen and respect for all of nature’s creations. The story itself teaches the importance of patience and listening as it follows the Water Spider's journey to retrieve fire for the other animals to survive the cold. As the other animals step forth one after another to proclaim that they shall be the ones to retrieve the fire, the Water spider sits and waits while listening to her fellow animals. As they finish and wrestle with their fears, she steps forward and announces that she will be the one to bring it back. As they laugh and doubt her she weaves a bowl out of her own web that sails her across the water to retrieve the fire. She brings back a hot coal out of which they make fire, and they celebrate her honor and bravery.

History

The Potawatomi are first mentioned in French records, which suggest that in the early 17th century, they lived in what is now southwestern Michigan. During the Beaver Wars they fled to the area around Green Bay to escape attacks by both the Iroquois and the Neutral Nation, who were seeking expanded hunting grounds. It is estimated in 1658 that the Potawatomi numbered around 3,000.

As an important part of Tecumseh's Confederacy, Potawatomi warriors took part in Tecumseh's War, the War of 1812 and the Peoria War.  Their alliances switched repeatedly between United Kingdom and the United States as power relations shifted between the nations, and they calculated effects on their trade and land interests.

At the time of the War of 1812, a band of Potawatomi inhabited the area near Fort Dearborn, where Chicago developed. Led by the chiefs Blackbird and Nuscotomeg (Mad Sturgeon), a force of about 500 warriors attacked the United States evacuation column leaving Fort Dearborn; they killed most of the civilians and 54 of Captain Nathan Heald's force, and wounded many others. George Ronan, the first graduate of West Point to be killed in combat, died in this ambush. The incident is referred to as the "Fort Dearborn Massacre". A Potawatomi chief named Mucktypoke (Black Partridge), counseled his fellow warriors against the attack. Later he saved some of the civilian captives who were being ransomed by the Potawatomi.

French period (1615–1763)
The French period of contact began with early explorers who reached the Potawatomi in western Michigan.  They also found the tribe located along the Door Peninsula of Wisconsin. By the end of the French period, the Potawatomi had begun a move to the Detroit area, leaving the large communities in Wisconsin.
 Madouche during the Fox Wars
 Millouisillyny
 Onanghisse (Wnaneg-gizs "Shimmering Light") at Green Bay
 Otchik at Detroit

British period (1763–1783)
The British period of contact began when France ceded its lands after the defeat in the French and Indian War (or Seven Years' War). Pontiac's Rebellion was an attempt by Native Americans to push the British and other European settlers out of their territory. The Potawatomi captured every British Frontier Garrison but the one at Detroit.

The Potawatomi nation continued to grow and expanded westward from Detroit, most notably in the development of the St. Joseph villages adjacent to the Miami in southwestern Michigan. The Wisconsin communities continued and moved south along the Lake Michigan shoreline.
 Nanaquiba (Water Moccasin) at Detroit
 Ninivois at Detroit
 Peshibon at St. Joseph

United States treaty period (1783–1830)
The United States treaty period of Potawatomi history began with the Treaty of Paris (1783), which ended the American Revolutionary War and established the United States' interest in the lower Great Lakes. It lasted until the treaties for Indian Removal were signed. The US recognized the Potawatomi as a single tribe. They often had a few tribal leaders whom all villages accepted. The Potawatomi had a decentralized society, with several main divisions based on geographic locations: Milwaukee or Wisconsin area, Detroit or Huron River, the St. Joseph River, the Kankakee River, Tippecanoe and Wabash Rivers, the Illinois River and Lake Peoria, and the Des Plaines and Fox Rivers.

The chiefs listed below are grouped by geographic area.

Milwaukee Potawatomi
 Manamol
 Siggenauk (: "Le Tourneau" or "Blackbird")

Chicago Potawatomi
 Billy Caldwell, also known as Sauganash (Zhaaganaash: "Englishman")  (1780–1841)

Des Plaines and Fox River Potawatomi
 Aptakisic ("Half Day")
 Mukatapenaise ( "Blackbird")
 Waubansee (He Causes Paleness)
 Waweachsetoh along with La Gesse, Gomo or Masemo (Resting Fish)

Illinois River Potawatomi

 Mucktypoke (: "Black Partridge")
 Senachewine ( 1831) (Petacho or  "Difficult Current") was the brother of Gomo who was chief among the Lake Peoria Potawatomi

Kankakee River (Iroquois and Yellow Rivers) Potawatomi
 Main Poc, also known as Webebeset ("Crafty One")
 Micsawbee 19th century
 Notawkah (Rattlesnake) on the Yellow River
 Nuscotomeg ("Mad Sturgeon") on the Iroquois and Kankakee Rivers
 Mesasa ("Turkey Foot")

St. Joseph and Elkhart Potawatomi
 Chebass (: "Little Duck") on the St. Joseph River
 Five Medals (: "Five-coin") on the Elkhart River
 Onaska on the Elkhart River
 Topinbee (He who sits Quietly) ( 1826)

Tippecanoe and Wabash River Potawatomi
 Aubenaubee (1761–1837/8) on the Tippecanoe River
 Askum (More and More) on the Eel River
 George Cicott (1800?–1833)
 Keesass on the Wabash River
 Kewanna (1790?–1840s?) (Prairie Chicken) Eel River
 Kinkash (see Askum)
 Magaago
 Monoquet (1790s–1830s) on the Tippecanoe River
 Tiosa on the Tippecanoe River
 Winamac ("Catfish")—allied with the British during the War of 1812
 Winamac ("Catfish")—allied with the Americans during the War of 1812

Fort Wayne Potawatomi

 Metea (1760?–1827) ("Sulks")
 Wabnaneme on the Pigeon River

American removal period (1830–1840)
The removal period of Potawatomi history began with the treaties of the late 1820s, when the United States created reservations. Billy Caldwell and Alexander Robinson negotiated for the United Nations of Chippewa, Ottawa and Potowatomi in the Second Treaty of Prairie du Chien (1829), by which they ceded most of their lands in Wisconsin and Michigan. Some Potawatomi became religious followers of the "Kickapoo Prophet", Kennekuk. Over the years, the US reduced the size of the reservations under pressure for land by incoming European Americans. 

The final step followed the Treaty of Chicago, negotiated in 1833 for the tribes by Caldwell and Robinson. In return for land cessions, the US promised new lands, annuities and supplies to enable the peoples to develop new homes. The Illinois Potawatomi were removed to Nebraska and the Indiana Potawatomi to Kansas, both west of the Mississippi River. Often annuities and supplies were reduced, or late in arrival, and the Potawatomi suffered after their relocations. Those in Kansas later were removed to Indian Territory, now Oklahoma. The removal of the Indiana Potawatomi was documented by a Catholic priest, Benjamin Petit, who accompanied the Indians on the Potawatomi Trail of Death. Petit died while returning to Indiana. His diary was published in 1941 by the Indiana Historical Society.

Many Potawatomi found ways to remain, primarily those in Michigan. Others fled to their Odawa neighbors or to Canada to avoid removal to the west.

 Iowa, Wabash River
 Maumksuck ("Big Foot") at Lake Geneva
 Mecosta ("Having a Bear's Foot")

 Chief Menominee (1791?–1841) Twin Lakes of Marshall County
 Pamtipee of Nottawasippi
 Mackahtamoah ("Black Wolf") of Nottawasippi
 Pashpoho of Yellow River near Rochester, Indiana
 Pepinawah
 Leopold Pokagon (–1841)
 Simon Pokagon (–1899)
 Sauganash (Billy Caldwell) removed his band ultimately to what would become Council Bluffs, Iowa in 1838, where they lived at what was known as Caldwell's Camp. Father Pierre-Jean De Smet established a mission there that was active in 1837–1839.
 Topinbee (The Younger) on the St. Joseph River
 Wabanim ("White Dog") on the Iroquois River
  (Snapping Turtle) on the Iroquois River
 Wanatah
 Weesionas (see Ashkum)
 Wewesh

Bands

There are several active bands of Potawatomi.

United States
Federally recognized Potawatomi tribes in the United States:
 Citizen Potawatomi Nation, Oklahoma
 Forest County Potawatomi Community, Wisconsin;
 Hannahville Indian Community, Michigan;
 Match-E-Be-Nash-She-Wish Band of Pottawatomi (also known as the Gun Lake tribe), based in Dorr in Allegan County, Michigan;
 Nottawaseppi Huron Band of Potawatomi, based in Calhoun County, Michigan;
 Pokagon Band of Potawatomi Indians, Michigan and Indiana; and
 Prairie Band of Potawatomi Nation, Kansas.

Canada – First Nations with Potawatomi people
 Caldwell First Nation, Point Pelee and Pelee Island, Ontario
 Chippewas of Nawash Unceded First Nation, Bruce Peninsula, Ontario;
 Saugeen First Nation, Ontario (Bruce Peninsula);
 Chippewas of Kettle and Stony Point, Ontario;
 Moose Deer Point First Nation, Ontario
 Walpole Island First Nation on an unceded island between the United States and Canada
 Wasauksing First Nation, Parry Island, Ontario

Population

Clans

La Chauvignerie (1736) and Morgan (1877) mention among the Potawatomi doodems (clans) being:

 Bené (Turkey)
 Gagagshi (Crow)
 Gnew (Golden Eagle)
 Jejakwe (Thunderer, i.e. Crane)
 Mag (Loon)
 Mekchi (Frog)
 Mek (Beaver)
 Mewi'a (Wolf)
 Mgezewa (Bald Eagle)
 Mkedésh-gékékwa (Black Hawk)
 Mko (Bear)
 Mshéwé (Elk)
 Mshike''' (Turtle)
 Nme (Sturgeon)
 Nmébena (Carp)
 Shage'shi (Crab)
 Wabozo (Rabbit)
 Wakeshi (Fox)

Ethnobotany
They regard Epigaea repens as their tribal flower and consider it to have come directly from their divinity. Allium tricoccum  is consumed in traditional Potawatomi cuisine. They mix an infusion of the root of Uvularia grandiflora  with lard and use it as salve to massage sore muscles and tendons. They use Symphyotrichum novae-angliae as a fumigating reviver. Vaccinium myrtilloides is part of their traditional cuisine, and is eaten fresh, dried, and canned. They also use the root bark of the plant for an unspecified ailment.

Location

The Potawatomi first lived in Lower Michigan, then moved to northern Wisconsin and eventually settled into northern Indiana and central Illinois. In the early 19th century, major portions of Potawatomi lands were seized by the U.S. government. Following the Treaty of Chicago in 1833, by which the tribe ceded its lands in Illinois, most of the Potawatomi people were removed to Indian Territory west of the Mississippi River. Many perished en route to new lands in the west on their journey through Iowa, Kansas and Indian Territory (now Oklahoma), following what became known as the "Trail of Death".

Language

Potawatomi (also spelled Pottawatomie; in Potawatomi Bodéwadmimwen or Bodéwadmi Zheshmowen or Neshnabémwen) is a Central Algonquian language and is spoken around the Great Lakes in Michigan and Wisconsin. It is also spoken by Potawatomi in Kansas, Oklahoma, and in southern Ontario. There are fewer than 1300 people who speak Potawatomi as a first language, most of them elderly. The people are working to revitalize the language.

The Potawatomi language is most similar to the Odawa language; it also has borrowed a considerable amount of vocabulary from Sauk. Like the Odawa language, or the Ottawa dialect of the Anishinaabe language, the Potawatomi language exhibits a great amount of vowel syncope.

Many places in the Midwest have names derived from the Potawatomi language, including Waukegan, Muskegon, Oconomowoc, Pottawattamie County, Kalamazoo, and Skokie.

Potawatomi people
Ron Baker: played for the New York Knicks and the Washington Wizards.
Charles J. Chaput (born 1944 – son of a Potawatomi woman): Catholic Archbishop of Philadelphia from 2011 to 2020.
Kelly Church (Potawatomi/Odawa/Ojibwe): basket maker, painter, and educator.
Robin Wall Kimmerer: botanist and writer – author of Braiding Sweetgrass.
Simon Pokagon: the "Hereditary and Last Chief" of the Pokagon Band.
Leopold Pokagon: head of the Potawatomi in the Saint Joseph River Valley.
Jeri Redcorn: the Oklahoman artist who revived traditional Caddo pottery.
Topinabee: head of the Potawatomi of the Saint Joseph River Valley.
Stephanie "Pyet" Despain: winner of the cooking competition, Next Level Chef''.

See also

 Cherokee Commission (allotment of Cherokee Outlet reservation)
 Potawatomi Trail of Death
 Treaty with the Potawatomi
 Theresa Marsh
 Nanabozho
 Chief Monoquet

References

Cited sources

External links

 
 Hannahville Indian Community; Wilson, MI
 Citizen Potawatomi Nation, official website
 First Nations Compact Histories: Potawatomi History
 Forest County Potawatomi
 Kettle & Stony Point First Nation
 Match-E-Be-Nash-She-Wish Band of Pottawatomi (Gun Lake)
 Moose Deer Point First Nation
 Nottawaseppi Huron Band of Potawatomi
 Pokagon Band of Potawatomi Indians
 Potawatomi Author Larry Mitchell
 Prairie Band Potawatomi Nation
 Treaties with the Potawatomi
 Treaty Between the Ottawa, Chippewa, Wyandot, and Potawatomi Indians
 Potawatomi Migration from Wisconsin and Michigan to Canada

 
Algonquian peoples
Great Lakes tribes
Native American tribes in Kansas
Native American tribes in Illinois
Native American tribes in Michigan
Native American tribes in Wisconsin
Native American tribes in Oklahoma
Algonquian ethnonyms
Native American tribes in Indiana
Native American tribes in Nebraska